Tsghuni is a village in the Sisian Municipality of the Syunik Province in Armenia.

Demographics 
The population of the village was 71 in the 2001 census.

References 

Populated places in Syunik Province